Bjørn Moe (born 19 March 1945) is a Norwegian conductor. He is an associate professor at the Department for Music at the Norwegian University of Science and Technology and has since 1973 been conductor of Nidaros Cathedral Boys' Choir.  He started as a boy soprano in the choir at the age of 8, and has later sung both tenor and bass. In 2002 Bjørn Moe was awarded HM The King's Medal of Merit in gold for his work with the choir.

References

1945 births
Living people
Norwegian conductors (music)
Male conductors (music)
Recipients of the King's Medal of Merit in gold
21st-century conductors (music)
21st-century Norwegian male musicians